Agaricus augustus, known commonly as the prince, is a basidiomycete fungus of the genus Agaricus.

Taxonomy
According to Heinemann's (1978) popular division of Agaricus, A. augustus belongs to section Arvenses. The system proposed by Wasser (2002) classifies A. augustus within subgenus Flavoagaricus, section Majores, subsection Flavescentes. Moreover, there have been attempts to recognise distinct varieties, namely A. augustus var. augustus Fr., and A. augustus var. perrarus (Schulzer) Bon & Cappelli. The specific epithet augustus is a Latin adjective meaning noble.

Description 
The fruiting bodies of Agaricus augustus are large and distinctive agarics. The cap cuticle is dry, and densely covered with concentrically arranged, brown-coloured scales on a white to yellow background.

The flesh is thick, firm and white and may discolour yellow when bruised. The gills are crowded and pallid at first, and turn pink then dark brown with maturity. The gills are not attached to the stem—they are free. Immature specimens bear a delicate white partial veil with darker-coloured warts, extending from the stem to the cap periphery.

In mature specimens, the partial veil is torn and left behind as a pendulous ring adorning the stem. Above the ring, the stem is white to yellow and smooth. Below, it is covered with numerous small scales. Its flesh is thick, white and sometimes has a narrow central hollow. The stem base extends deeply into the substrate.

The mushroom's odour is strong and nutty, of anise or almonds, which can be associated with the presence of benzaldehyde and benzyl alcohol. Its taste has been described as not distinctive.

Under a microscope, the ellipsoid-shaped spores are seen characteristically large at 7–10 by 4.5–6.5 μm. The basidia are 4-spored. The spore mass is coloured chocolate-brown.

A species initially reported from North America, A. subrufescens closely resembles A. augustus in appearance. However, A. subrufescens produces smaller spores, sized 6–7.5 by 4–5 µm.

Identification
Agaricus augustus shows a red positive Schaeffer's test reaction. The cap cuticle turns yellow when a 10% potassium hydroxide solution is applied.

Toxic lookalikes include Amanitas which stain yellow when bruised or emit bad odor. Another similar-looking toxic species is Agaricus moelleri.

Habitat
Agaricus augustus has a widespread distribution, occurring throughout Europe, North America, North Africa and Asia. This mushroom is found in deciduous and coniferous woods and in gardens and by roadside verges. The fungus is saprotrophic and terrestrial — it acquires nutrients from decaying dead organic matter and its fruiting bodies occur on humus-rich soil. The species seems adapted to thriving near human activity, for it also emerges from disturbed ground. In Europe, A. augustus fruits in late summer and autumn.

Edibility

This mushroom is a choice edible, and is collected widely for consumption in Eurasia, the United States, Canada and some parts of Mexico. A. augustus has been implicated in specifically bioaccumulating the metal cadmium, with a quantity of 2.44 mg per kilogram of fresh weight as recorded in one Swiss study. The same phenomenon is true for other edible species of Agaricus, namely A. arvensis, A. macrosporus and A. silvicola, though quantities may vary greatly depending on species, which part of the fruiting body is analysed, and the level of contamination of the substrate. Specimens collected near metal smelters and urban areas have a higher cadmium content. The hymenium contains the highest concentration of metal, followed by the rest of the cap, while the lower part of the stem contains the least.

See also
List of Agaricus species

References

External links
 
 Tom Volk's fungus of the month - Agaricus augustus
 Electronic Atlas of the Plants of British Columbia - Agaricus augustus
 Mykoweb - Agaricus augustus

augustus
Edible fungi
Fungi of Europe
Fungi of North America
Fungi described in 1838
Taxa named by Elias Magnus Fries